Daniel 'Dani' Peláez Bellido (born 4 April 1986) is a Spanish professional footballer who plays for UD Gijón Industrial as a defensive midfielder.

Football career
Born in Gijón, Asturias, Peláez graduated from Sporting de Gijón's youth setup, and made his senior debuts while on loan at lowly UC Ceares in the 2005–06 campaign, in Tercera División. In the 2007 summer he moved to another reserve team, Atlético Malagueño also in the fourth level.

Peláez made his first-team debut on 11 October 2007, coming on as a late substitute in a 2–1 away success over CD Tenerife for the season's Copa del Rey. He made his league debut on 17 February of the following year, again from the bench in a 3–1 home win against CD Castellón in the Segunda División championship.

On 29 July 2008 Peláez joined UD Lanzarote, in Segunda División B. However, he was released in December due to the club's financial problems, and joined fellow league team Club Marino de Luanco in the following month.

Peláez moved to fourth level's CD Llanes in October 2009. He appeared regularly for the club, and joined Candás CF in the same division in June 2011.

In August 2013 Peláez moved abroad for the first time in his career, signing for Maltese Premier League side Rabat Ajax F.C. After featuring regularly for the side during his only season, which ended in relegation, he returned to his native country and joined third level's CD Lealtad.

In July 2016, Peláez signed with fourth tier's UC Ceares, where he played eleven years ago. One year later, he moved to neighbours Gijón Industrial.

References

External links
 
 Futbolme profile  
 

1986 births
Living people
Footballers from Gijón
Spanish footballers
Association football wingers
Segunda División players
Segunda División B players
Tercera División players
Atlético Malagueño players
Málaga CF players
Marino de Luanco footballers
CD Lealtad players
Maltese Premier League players
Rabat Ajax F.C. players
Spanish expatriate footballers
Expatriate footballers in Malta
UC Ceares players